Górzno  is a town in Brodnica County, Kuyavian-Pomeranian Voivodeship, Poland, with 1,369 inhabitants (2006).

The Battle of Górzno was fought nearby in 1629.

References

Cities and towns in Kuyavian-Pomeranian Voivodeship
Brodnica County